Derbion (formerly Intu Derby, Westfield Derby and the Eagle Centre) is a large indoor shopping centre in Derby, England. It is the largest shopping centre in the East Midlands and the 15th largest in the United Kingdom.

Overview 
Derbion may contain up to 200 shops, a supermarket, a cinema and many eateries. Anchor tenants include Next, Marks & Spencer and Sainsbury's. There is also a cinema, named the Showcase Cinema de Lux, in the centre as well as a bowling arcade named Hollywood Bowl Group and an adventure golf site named ‘Paradise Island’. It has three car parks and is a few minutes walk away from both Derby's bus and railway stations.

The UK's largest, but mainly unoccupied, indoor market, the Eagle Market, adjoins the centre. The market and Derby Theatre, which is accessed through the market, were considered to be part of the centre until 2007, when the centre was known as The Eagle Centre. When the centre was expanded and renamed (see below), the market, owned by the Westfield Group and Hermès, but operated by Derby City Council, did not take on the Westfield name; it slightly changed its name from the Eagle Centre Market to simply the Eagle Market and introduced its own branding, separate from both the former Eagle Centre's and Westfield's), making itself distinct from the shopping centre for the first time.

A much smaller indoor shopping precinct, St Peter's Way, is also physically connected to Derbion. Customers can walk seamlessly between the two.

History
The centre opened as The Eagle Centre on 20 November 1975, at a cost of £7 million. Several streets of pre-1950s terraced housing were demolished to make way for the new centre, including a street called Eagle Street, which gave the name of the new development.

The centre's market was rebuilt in 1990, and the entire centre was refurbished in 1999. A £340m extension to the Eagle Centre was opened on 9 October 2007 by TV celebrity Tess Daly. The extension sits on the site of the former Castlefields Main Centre, a dilapidated outdoor shopping centre already owned by the Westfield Group.

As well as adding many new retailers, the extension also houses an 800-seat foodcourt including a KFC outlet, a £30m twelve-screen Cinema de Lux and even more car parking facilities.

Many retailers, including Debenhams, Marks & Spencer and the now defunct Republic, closed their existing Derby stores to move to bigger stores in the extension. When the extension opened, the Eagle Centre was renamed Westfield Derby, in line with other Westfield shopping centres.

On 3 December 2010 a fire, which started in the car park, caused thousands of shoppers to be evacuated from the building.

In March 2014, it was announced that Intu was to acquire Westfield Derby. On 1 May 2014, it was rebranded as Intu Derby.

In April 2019, Intu sold 50% of the centre to Cale Street Investments, an investment firm backed by the Kuwait Investment Office. On 9 September 2020, following Intu's administration, Cale Street purchased the remainder of Intu Derby. The centre was referred to as the Derby Centre while a new name was sought.

The chosen name of Derbion was decided on and released to public in late January 2021, taking effect on 1 March, with external signage changes planned for May.

Naming timeline 
Derbion has been given several different names throughout its history.

1975–2007: The Eagle Centre
2007–2014: Westfield Derby
2014–2020: intu Derby
2020–2021: Derby Centre
2021–: Derbion

See also

 List of shopping centres in the United Kingdom

References 

Economy of Derby
Shopping centres in Derbyshire
Buildings and structures in Derby
Shopping malls established in 1975
1975 establishments in England